Jetsada Boonruangrod (born October 1, 1979) is a Thai retired professional footballer who played as a defensive midfielder.

External links
 Profile at Goal

1979 births
Living people
Jetsada Boonruangrod
Jetsada Boonruangrod
Association football midfielders
Jetsada Boonruangrod
Jetsada Boonruangrod
Jetsada Boonruangrod
Jetsada Boonruangrod
Jetsada Boonruangrod
Jetsada Boonruangrod